Hannaford may refer to:

People
 Alf Hannaford (1890–1969), South Australian inventor and industrialist
 Ann Hannaford Lamar (born 1952), American jurist
 Charlie Hannaford (footballer) (1896–1970), English footballer
 Clive Hannaford (1903–1967), Australian politician
 Ernest Hannaford (1879–1955), Australian politician
 Esther Hannaford, Australian singer and actor
 Frederick Hannaford (1830–1898), farmer and politician in South Australia
 George William Hannaford (1852–1927), South Australian orchardist, pioneer apple exporter
 Ian Hannaford (born 1940), Australian rules footballer
 John Hannaford (born 1949), Australian politician
 Jule Murat Hannaford (1850–1934), American railroad businessman
 Mark W. Hannaford (1925–1985), American politician
 Matt Hannaford, MLBPA certified sports agent and partner at MVP Sports Group
 Peter Hannaford (born 1939), Australian scientist
 Peter D. Hannaford (1932–2015), American political consultant and author
 Robert Hannaford (born 1944), Australian artist
 Ross Hannaford (1950–2016), Australian musician
 Samuel Hannaford (1835–1911), American architect
 Susannah Hannaford (1790–1861), early immigrant to South Australia
 Tsering Hannaford (born 1987), South Australian artist
 Vin Hannaford (1885–1919), former Australian rules footballer 
 Walter Hannaford (1868–1942), farmer and politician in South Australia

Places
 Hannaford, North Dakota, a town in North Dakota
 Hannaford, Queensland, a rural locality in Australia

Other
 Hannaford, American supermarket chain 
 Samuel Hannaford & Sons, Cincinnati-based architectural firm founded by Samuel Hannaford
 Hannaford Bee, an aircraft originally named Rose Parakeet

See also
 Hannafordia, a genus of flowering plants native to Australia
 Elizabeth Hanniford (1909–1977), New York politician